Unconventional weapon may refer to:

Improvised weapon
Weapon of mass destruction
Any weapon not considered to be a conventional weapon
Weapons used in unconventional warfare